Kings of Metal MMXIV is a re-recorded album released by the American heavy metal band Manowar in February 2014. It's a re-recording of their album Kings of Metal from 1988. In support of the album the band started their "Kings Of Metal MMXIV World Tour".

Track listing 
Tracks 10 and 11 on disc 1 are listed as bonus tracks.

Personnel

Manowar
 Eric Adams – vocals
 Joey DeMaio – bass, keyboards 
 Karl Logan – guitars, keyboards 
 Donnie Hamzik – drums

Production
 Brian Blessed - grandfather's voice in spoken narration (A Warrior’s Prayer MMXIV)

Charts

References 

2014 remix albums
Manowar albums